Alexey Andreevich Kunchenko (born May 02, 1984) is a Russian mixed martial artist (MMA) who competes in the welterweight division. He is a former M-1 Global welterweight champion and competed in the Ultimate Fighting Championship (UFC) and Professional Fighters League (PFL).

Mixed martial arts career

Early career 
Kunchenko started his professional MMA career since 2013 and fought primary in Russia under various promoters, notably M-1 Global. He was the M-1 Global welterweight champion  and amassed a record of 18-0 prior to being signed to the UFC.

Ultimate Fighting Championship

Kunchenko made his UFC debut on August 4, 2018 against Thiago Alves at UFC Fight Night: Hunt vs. Oleinik. He won the fight by unanimous decision.

His next fight came on December 1, 2018 at UFC Fight Night: dos Santos vs. Tuivasa against Yushin Okami. He won the fight via unanimous decision.

Kunchenko was scheduled to face Laureano Staropoli on August 10, 2019 at UFC Fight Night 156. However, it was announced on July 29, 2019 that Staropoli was forced to pull out of the fight due to a broken nose and was replaced by Gilbert Burns. Kunchenko lost the fight via unanimous decision.

Kunchenko faced Elizeu Zaleski dos Santos on March 14, 2020 at UFC Fight Night 170. He lost the fight via a controversial unanimous decision.

Professional Fighters League
On February 18, 2021, Kunchenko announced on his Instagram that he had signed a 5 fight contract with PFL for their 2021 season, and would be competing in the organization's welterweight division.

Kunchenko was set to face fellow UFC vet Gleison Tibau on April 29, 2021 at PFL 2 as the start of the 2021 PFL Welterweight tournament. On March 25, it was announced that Kunchenko pulled out of the bout.

Kunchenko faced Sadibou Sy at PFL 5 on June 17, 2021. He lost the bout via unanimous decision.

Post PFL 
Kunchenko faced Magomedsaygid Alibekov on December 3, 2022 at RCC 13, losing the bout via split decision.

Kunchenko faced Gleison Tibau on February 11, 2023 at RCC, winning the bout via unanimous decision.

Championships and accomplishments

Mixed martial arts
M-1 Global
M-1 Global Welterweight Champion (Four times)

Mixed martial arts record

|-
|Win
|align=center|21–4
|Gleison Tibau
|Decision (unanimous)
|RCC 14
|
|align=center|3
|align=center|5:00
|Tyumen, Russia
|
|-
|Loss
|align=center|20–4
|Magomedsaygid Alibekov
|Decision (split)
|RCC 13
|
|align=center|3
|align=center|5:00
|Yekaterinburg, Russia
|
|-
|Loss
|align=center|20–3
|Sadibou Sy
|Decision (unanimous)
|PFL 5 
|
|align=center|3
|align=center|5:00
|Atlantic City, New Jersey, United States
|
|-
|Loss
|align=center|20–2
|Elizeu Zaleski dos Santos
|Decision (unanimous)
|UFC Fight Night: Lee vs. Oliveira 
|
|align=center|3
|align=center|5:00
|Brasilia, Brazil
|
|-
|Loss
|align=center|20–1
|Gilbert Burns
|Decision (unanimous)
|UFC Fight Night: Shevchenko vs. Carmouche 2 
|
|align=center|3
|align=center|5:00
|Montevideo, Uruguay
|
|-
|Win
|align=center|20–0
|Yushin Okami
|Decision (unanimous)
|UFC Fight Night: dos Santos vs. Tuivasa
|
|align=center|3
|align=center|5:00
|Adelaide, Australia
|
|-
|Win
|align=center|19–0
|Thiago Alves
|Decision (unanimous)
|UFC Fight Night: Hunt vs. Oleinik
|
|align=center|3
|align=center|5:00
|Moscow, Russia
|
|-
|Win
|align=center|18–0
|Alexander Butenko
|TKO (punches and knees)
|M-1 Challenge 90
|
|align=center|3
|align=center|4:04
|St. Petersburg, Russia
|
|-
|Win
|align=center|17–0
|Sergey Romanov
|KO (punches)
|M-1 Challenge 84
|
|align=center|1
|align=center|2:35
|St. Petersburg, Russia
|
|-
|Win
|align=center|16–0
|Maxim Grabovich
|Decision (unanimous)
|M-1 Challenge 75
|
|align=center|5
|align=center|5:00
|Moscow, Russia
|
|-
|Win
|align=center|15–0
|Murad Abdulaev
|Decision (unanimous)
|M-1 Challenge 72
|
|align=center|5
|align=center|5:00
|Moscow, Russia
|
|-
|Win
|align=center|14–0
|Eduardo Ramon
|Decision (unanimous)
|M-1 Challenge 70
|
|align=center|3
|align=center|5:00
|Syktyvkar, Russia
|
|-
|Win
|align=center|13–0
|Murad Abdulaev
|KO (punches)
|M-1 Challenge 65
|
|align=center|4
|align=center|3:12
|St. Petersburg, Russia
|
|-
|Win
|align=center|12–0
|Carlos Alexandre Pereira
|KO (punches)
|OMMAF: Scythian Gold 2015
|
|align=center|1
|align=center|N/A
|Orenburg, Russia
|
|-
|Win
|align=center|11–0
|Alexandre Ramos
|KO (punches)
|M-1 Challenge 62
|
|align=center|1
|align=center|4:32
|Sochi, Russia
|
|-
|Win
|align=center|10–0
|Ron Keslar
|KO (punch)
|League S-70: Plotforma 6th
|
|align=center|3
|align=center|1:35
|Sochi, Russia
|
|-
|Win
|align=center|9–0
|Dez Parker
|KO (punches)
|M-1 Challenge 57
|
|align=center|1
|align=center|2:55
|Orenburg, Russia
|
|-
|Win
|align=center|8–0
|Grigoriy Kichigin
|KO (punches)
|M-1 Challenge 54 / ACB 12
|
|align=center|1
|align=center|2:33
|St. Petersburg, Russia
|
|-
|Win
|align=center|7–0
|Ronny Alexander Landaeta Utrera
|Decision (unanimous)
|OMMAF: Scythian Gold 2014
|
|align=center|3
|align=center|5:00
|Orenburg, Russia
|
|-
|Win
|align=center|6–0
|Adil Boranbayev
|TKO (punches)
|League S-70: Plotforma 5th
|
|align=center|2
|align=center|4:46
|Sochi, Russia
|
|-
|Win
|align=center|5–0
|Felipe Salvador Nsue Ayiugono
|TKO (punches)
|Battle of Moscow 16
|
|align=center|2
|align=center|4:05
|Moscow, Russia
|
|-
|Win
|align=center|4–0
|Anatoly Safronov
|TKO (retirement)
|M-1 Challenge 47
|
|align=center|3
|align=center|2:00
|Moscow, Russia
|
|-
|Win
|align=center|3–0
|Gennadiy Kovalev
|TKO (punches)
|International Tournament of Pankration
|
|align=center|2
|align=center|4:13
|Yuzhno-Sakhalinsk, Russia
|
|-
|Win
|align=center|2–0
|Jani Ridasmaa
|TKO (corner stoppage)
|Tyumen Fight Night
|
|align=center|2
|align=center|0.00
|Tyumen, Russia
|
|-
|Win
|align=center|1–0
|Gasan Mamedov
|Submission (rear-naked choke)
|Nord Desant
|
|align=center|2
|align=center|3:43
|Yugra, Russia
|
|-

Professional kickboxing record

|- style="background:#fbb;"
| 2011-02-26 || Loss ||align=left| Alexander Stetsurenko || Ice Storm 3 (81 kg) || Nefteyugansk, Russia || Decision (Unanimous) || 3 || 3:00 

|- style="background:#fbb;"
| 2009-10-17 || Loss||align=left| Jiří Žák || Souboj Titánů || Plzeň, Czech Republic || Decision (Majority) || 3 || 3:00

|-  bgcolor="#fbb"
| 2009-02-19 || Loss||align=left| Dmitry Shakuta || Tatneft Arena European Cup 2009, First Round (80 kg) || Kazan, Russia || Ext.R Decision (Unanimous) || 4 || 3:00
|-
| colspan=9 | Legend:

See also
List of male mixed martial artists

References

External links
 Aleksei Kunchenko at PFL
 
 

1995 births
Living people
Russian male mixed martial artists
Russian Muay Thai practitioners
Russian practitioners of Brazilian jiu-jitsu
Welterweight mixed martial artists
Mixed martial artists utilizing ARB
Mixed martial artists utilizing Muay Thai
Mixed martial artists utilizing Brazilian jiu-jitsu
Ultimate Fighting Championship male fighters
Russian people of Ukrainian descent
People from Prokopyevsk
Sportspeople from Kemerovo Oblast